The St Rule Trophy is an international women's amateur golf tournament contested on the St Andrews Links in Scotland. It has been played annually since 1984. The format is 54-hole stroke play over two days. Since 2014, two rounds have been played on the New course on the first day and one round on the Old course on the final day.

Originally the event was contested over 36 holes of the Old course on a single day, a Saturday. The original trophy was stolen from the St Rule Club in 1986. The event was extended to 54 holes in 1989 when the men's St Andrews Links Trophy was founded. Initially the two events were played concurrently, the women playing one round on the New and Old courses on the opening day and a further round on the Old course on the second day. From 1993 the event was played on a different weekend to the St Andrews Links Trophy, with one round played on the New course on the first day and two rounds played on the Old course on the final day.

Winners

Source:

See also
St Andrews Links Trophy

References

External links
Tournament homepage
List of winners

Amateur golf tournaments in the United Kingdom
Golf tournaments in Scotland
Sport in Fife
Annual sporting events in the United Kingdom
1984 establishments in Scotland
Recurring sporting events established in 1984